Eupithecia calientes is a moth in the family Geometridae first described by András Mátyás Vojnits in 1992. It is found in Chile and/or Peru.

References

Moths described in 1992
calientes
Moths of South America